Matthew "Matt" White (born 22 February 1974 in Sydney, New South Wales) is an Australian former professional road racing cyclist. White has also worked as a sporting director for  but was let go because of doping offenses during his racing career. His most notable results are winning a stage of the 1999 Tour de Suisse and another stage victory at the 2005 Tour Down Under. He mainly worked as a domestique throughout his career, sacrificing personal ambitions to help his leader.

Biography
White started competitive cycling at age 14. Like so many other Australian professional riders he started his career on the track under Charlie Walsh, competing in the Junior World Championship in Athens. In 1994, he attended the Commonwealth Games in Victoria Canada,  his fourth spot in the Team Time Trial was taken by soon to be retired Phil Anderson but he did compete in & finish the road race. Turning professional in 1996 at age 22 with the Giant-Australian Institute of Sport team under the GIANT-A.I.S. Sports Director and Australian National Coach, German born Heiko Salzwedel. During this period the team's European headquarters were in Cottbus, Germany.

In this period White was not selected to ride the Tour de France with Lance Armstrong but did ride the 2003 Vuelta a España in support of Roberto Heras. In 2004, Matthew moved to the French Cofidis team to join fellow Australian Stuart O'Grady.

He was selected in the  team to ride the 2004 Tour de France, but did not make the start line after falling and breaking his collar bone just hours prior to the start while warming up. Much to his relief he was selected again in 2005 and made it to the start. In 2005, he won stage 4 at the Tour Down Under, besting fellow Aussie Robbie McEwen to the sprint after their escape group of six riders succeeded.

White also coached his wife, Jane Saville, to a bronze medal at the 2004 Athens Olympics in the 20 km race walk. The couple split their time between Sydney and Olivia, Spain.

In 2012, as head of Australia's cycling team, Orica-GreenEDGE, Matt White admitted that during his competitive career he used performance-enhancing drugs while on the  squad, where doping formed part of the team's strategy and said "I too was involved in that strategy". He stood down from his role with Orica-GreenEDGE on 13 October 2012. On 17 October 2012 Matt White was sacked as a national coach by Cycling Australia due to his use of performance-enhancing drugs. Despite his involvement in doping Orica-GreenEDGE announced on 11 June 2013 that it was reinstating Matt White as their sports director.

Major results

1992
 3rd  World U19 Team Pursuit Championship
1996
 2nd Overall Tour de Beauce (CAN)
 3rd Overall Tour of Wellington (NZL)
 1st Stage 1 TTT Tour of Wellington (NZL)
 2nd Stage 3 Hessen Rundfahrt (GER)
1997
 2nd Overall Giro del Capo (RSA)
 2nd Hennesee Rundfahrt (GER)
1998
 1st Joseph Sunde Memorial
1999
 1st Stage 6 Tour de Suisse
2002
 1st Stage 1 TTT Volta Ciclista a Catalunya
 1st Noosa International Criterium 
 1st 1st South Bank GP
2005
 1st Stage 4 Tour Down Under
2007
 1st Cronulla International Grand Prix

References

External links
 
 Results

Cyclists at the 2004 Summer Olympics
Australian male cyclists
Cyclists from Sydney
1974 births
Living people
Olympic cyclists of Australia
Australian Institute of Sport cyclists
Doping cases in cycling
Doping cases in Australian cycling
Tour de Suisse stage winners
Cyclists at the 2000 Summer Olympics